Wester Denoon is a small settlement in Angus, Scotland.  Approximately one mile to the north of Wester Denoon is the village of Eassie, where the Eassie Stone is displayed in a ruined church; this carved Pictish stone is dated prior to the Early Middle Ages.  Other nearby settlements are Charleston, Balkeerie and Kirkinch.  Two fragments of small Pictish cross-slabs have also been found at Wester Denoon itself (preserved in the Meffan Institute, Forfar).  One shows the stylised figure of a woman wearing a long dress or mantle fastened on the breast by a large brooch.

See also
Ark Hill
Sidlaw Hills

References

External links
View of a track outside of Western Denoon from the United Kingdom Geograph Official Site

Villages in Angus, Scotland